Frank Holohan Soccer Complex is an Australian association football stadium located in Endeavour Hills, a south-east suburb of Melbourne, Victoria. It is the home ground of NPL Victoria side Dandenong City. It maintains a capacity of 4,000, of which 400 are seated in the grandstand, completed in 2014. It is named for former City of Dandenong mayor and councillor, Frank Holohan.

Alongside the main ground, the Complex comprises two adjacent pitches for training and junior matches, changerooms, a club room, and a canteen.

Since 2021, the stadium also hosts Melbourne City W-League matches, following the club's relocation to south-east Melbourne.

References

Soccer venues in Melbourne
Sports venues completed in 1980
Event venues established in 1980
1980 establishments in Australia
Buildings and structures in the City of Casey
Sport in the City of Casey